Šarišské Dravce is a village and municipality in Sabinov District in the Prešov Region of north-eastern Slovakia.

History
In historical records the village was first mentioned in 1295.

Geography
The municipality lies at an altitude of 467 metres and covers an area of 9.928 km². It has a population of about 1244 people.

External links
http://www.statistics.sk/mosmis/eng/run.html
http://www.sardravce.sk

Villages and municipalities in Sabinov District
Šariš